The fifth generation Ram pickup was introduced by FCA US LLC in January 2018 at the North American International Auto Show in Detroit, Michigan.

Design 
The Ram 1500 and Ram Heavy Duty (HD) both have a drag area of 13 ft2 (1.21 m2). Full LED headlamps are available as an option on most trim levels, although most models also feature LED Daytime Running Lamps (DRL's). Either black or chrome front and rear bumpers, side mirrors, and door and tailgate handles, as well as black or chrome front grilles with unique designs for each trim level are available. All front grilles now feature the "RAM" lettering (this was only available on the higher trim levels of the previous generation). A vented Sport Hood is available on select trim levels. 18-inch, 20-inch, and 22-inch aluminum-alloy wheels (styled steel for base Tradesman models) are available, depending on the trim level selected. In addition, a newly redesigned RAM "Ram's-Head" graces the tailgate, as well as the steering wheel.

Cab configurations 

The 2019 Ram 1500 is available in two different configurations: either a four-door Quad Cab (Extended Cab) with a Standard Bed, or a four-door Crew Cab with either a Short Bed or a Standard Bed. A two-door Regular Cab model is unavailable with the new Ram 1500, due to low demand for this configuration.

The Ram Heavy Duty (HD) is available in three different configurations: a two-door Regular Cab with a Long Bed, a four-door Crew Cab with either a Standard Bed or a Long Bed, or a four-door Mega Cab with a Standard Bed.

The cab configurations available on each trim level are as follows:

Ram 1500 
 Quad Cab (Tradesman, Big Horn/Lone Star, Rebel, and Laramie only)
 Crew Cab (All trim levels)

Ram Heavy Duty (HD) 
 Regular Cab (Tradesman and Big Horn/Lone Star only)
 Crew Cab (All trim levels)
 Mega Cab (Big Horn/Lone Star, Laramie, Laramie Longhorn, and Limited: not available on Tradesman and 2500-only Power Wagon)

Trim levels 

The 2019 Ram 1500 is available in Tradesman, HFE (High Efficiency), Big Horn, Rebel, Laramie, Laramie Longhorn, and Laramie Limited trim levels (addition of the Sport model for Canada only). Each trim level of the Ram 1500 features its own interior design theme, with different materials and color schemes used throughout. Ram 1500 interior designers used different types of hammers as inspiration for interior designs.

The Tradesman trim level is the most basic trim level on the Ram 1500. Its design is more basic than other trim levels, with halogen headlamps, incandescent tail lamps, and a black plastic grille. The interior contains vinyl or cloth seats and the Uconnect 3 5.0BT radio.

More up-level than the Tradesman, the Big Horn/Lone Star comes standard with everything on the Tradesman plus fog lights, chrome grille, bumpers, and door handles, and a leather-wrapped steering wheel. The larger Uconnect 4 8.4-inch touchscreen also becomes available, with or without navigation. The Lone Star, similar to "Texas Edition" trucks offered by other manufacturers, is virtually identical to the Big Horn trim level, although the Lone Star is sold exclusively in the state of Texas, whereas the Big Horn is sold in all other states and in Canada. The Lone Star Silver comes with a chrome luxury grill, 20” Aluminum Wheels and side steps.

The North Edition adds off-road oriented features, such as Hill Descent Control and Tow Hooks, combined with body color bumpers, mirrors, and grille. With this special edition comes the Uconnect 4 8.4 touchscreen, 7-inch digital cluster display, dual zone climate control, and heated front seats and steering wheel.

Being the off-road oriented trim level, the Ram 1500 Rebel (1500 only; until it was finally added to 2500 for 2023) offers an electronic locking rear differential, 33-inch tires, and tow hooks. It comes standard with the Uconnect 3 5.0BT radio but can be upgraded to the Uconnect 4 8.4-inch touchscreen.

The Ram 1500 Rebel 12 (leather & sound group) offers a 12" touchscreen (1500 only). Standard features include the 900-watt Harman Kardon sound system with 19 speakers and black luxury leather seats. Door speakers have unique RADAR RED grille surrounds. The Rebel 12 production began in November 2018.

The Power Wagon (2500 only) is the off-road oriented model of the Ram 2500 lineup. Equipped with standard four-wheel drive (4X4) and available in a single configuration (Crew Cab, Short Bed, with the 6.4L HEMI V8 gasoline engine), it also includes unique interior trim, a unique front grille, a unique exterior decal package (which can also be deleted, if desired by the buyer), and larger, off-road tires with unique aluminum-alloy wheels. The name "Power Wagon" refers to the first Dodge Power Wagon trucks that were produced in 1946.

The Laramie is the mid-level trim of the Ram 1500. It features LED headlamps and tail lamps as standard, heated and ventilated leather seats, a standard Uconnect 4 8.4-inch touchscreen, 7-inch digital cluster display, and a memory feature. The Uconnect 4C 12-inch touchscreen is available.

An upgrade from the Laramie, the Laramie Longhorn features more luxurious features such as standard navigation, LED projector headlamps, chrome side steps, and genuine wood and leather in the interior. The Uconnect 4C 12-inch touchscreen is optional.

The Limited trim level is the most luxurious model of the Ram 1500 lineup. The Uconnect 4C 12-inch touchscreen is standard, as well as safety features such as blind spot monitoring, rear cross path detection, and trailer detection, and a four-corner air suspension. A 19-speaker Harman Kardon audio system is available.

The Sport is a Canada-only trim level that offers a sportier look in addition to a standard Uconnect 4 8.4-inch touchscreen, 7-inch digital cluster display, and heated front seats. Although the package is not available in the United States, buyers in the U.S. market can still order styling elements from the Canadian Sport trim level on some Ram 1500 trim levels. The only engine choice in this trim is the 5.7 Hemi.

Powertrain 

The engine is now equipped with the "eTorque" mild hybrid system, which uses a 0.4 kWh lithium-ion battery and a 16 horsepower electric motor and gives the truck improved fuel economy (MPG), and increased towing capacity. However, in Canada, the 3.6 Pentastar is only available in the Tradesman and Big Horn trims, leaving the 5.7 Hemi as the primary powerplant, with the option of the 3.0 EcoDiesel in some models.

It is unchanged from the previous-generation Ram 1500.

In addition to the standard  HEMI gasoline V8 engine, there is also a  HEMI V8 engine equipped with the eTorque mild hybrid system, which gives the truck improved fuel economy (MPG) and increased towing capacity. It is available on all Ram 1500 trim levels, regardless of cab configuration.

A new, third generation  EcoDiesel turbocharged diesel V6 powertrain, became available in the 2020 model year, delivering increased power, torque, and tow ratings. The same engine is used in the 2020 Jeep Gladiator (JT) and Jeep Wrangler (JL). The diesel engine option was discontinued from the Ram 1500 as well as from the Jeep Gladiator and Jeep Wrangler in January 2023 due to poor sales, tougher automotive emission standards being required by the Environmental Protection Agency for the 2023 model year, and due to Stellantis focusing its future on electric trucks for the Jeep and Ram brands, as the engine can no longer be modified further to meet the new regulations.

All engines in the Ram 1500 are mated to an eight-speed automatic transmission (produced by Chrysler for V6-powered models, or ZF for V8-powered models). All models are available with a choice of either two-wheel-drive (4x2) or four-wheel-drive (4x4), except for the Rebel, which is available exclusively with four-wheel-drive (4x4).

It is mated to a ZF-sourced eight-speed automatic transmission, replacing the previously-available Chrysler-built six-speed automatic unit. The  HEMI V8 is now the base engine in the Ram Heavy Duty (HD), as the previously-available base  HEMI V8 has been discontinued, reserved exclusively for Ram 1500 models.

Also available on all Ram Heavy Duty (HD) models, regardless of cab configuration (aside from the 2500 Power Wagon), is a newly-improved  Cummins turbodiesel inline-6 (I6) engine, now producing  (up  from the previous model's ) . Torque has been increased to a maximum  of torque (up  from the previous model's  of torque). It is mated to an Aisin-sourced heavy-duty six-speed automatic transmission, as with the previous-generation Ram Heavy Duty (HD). A manual transmission is no longer available as an option for the U.S. and Canadian market in 2019.

The Ram Heavy Duty (HD) is available with two-wheel-drive (4X2) on all models and is available with four-wheel-drive (4X4) as an option, except for the 2500 Power Wagon where four-wheel-drive (4X4) is standard.

Frame and body 
The frame and body structures feature 98 and 54 percent high-strength low-alloy steel respectively. Innovative high-strength steels allow auto components to be made thinner, and thereby lighter. The truck has lost around  overall when compared to the prior generation. Aluminum is used for the hood, tailgate, engine mounts, and lower control arms.

Suspension 
The latter feature can be activated via a button on the keyless entry key fob. In addition, the Ram 1500 also features active front grille shutters, which are now driver-adjustable, as well as a lower coefficient of drag for improved aerodynamic performance.

Also new for the 2019 Ram 1500 is a new 4X4 Off-Road Package, which includes a factory-equipped suspension lift, off-road tires, and enhanced off-road performance and handling. It is available on all trim levels, when equipped with 4X4.

Ram is using frequency response damping (FRD) shocks as standard, allowing for more aggressive damping during cornering and braking.

Driver assistance systems 
A toggle switch in the lower portion of the dashboard control parking sensor activation. The Ram 1500 gets blind spot monitoring that automatically extends down the length of a trailer when it is attached. The truck comes with a 360-degree surround view camera system providing a birds-eye view of the vehicle via four cameras. It can park perpendicular and parallel by its own by controlling steering, but braking and gear shift are still responsibly controlled by the driver.

In-vehicle infotainment 

Both the all-new 2019 RAM 1500 and RAM Heavy Duty (HD) offer a choice of four different infotainment systems, dependent upon the trim level chosen:

The base Uconnect 3 5.0BT radio, standard on Big Horn/Lone Star and optional on Tradesman, includes a five-inch touchscreen display, A/M-F/M Radio, Bluetooth hands-free calling and wireless audio streaming via A2DP, USB and auxiliary inputs, a rear-view backup camera display, and integrated digital compass. SiriusXM Satellite Radio can be added as an option to either trim level when this radio is selected. It is not available with either premium audio system option (see below).

The midlevel Uconnect 4 8.4 infotainment system, standard on Rebel, Laramie and optional on Big Horn/Lone Star, adds the following features to the base Uconnect 3 5.0BT radio: an 8.4-inch touchscreen display, SiriusXM Satellite Radio, Apple CarPlay and Android Auto smartphone integration, and a USB-C input that supports USB fast charging.

The premium Uconnect 4C 8.4 w/ GPS Navigation infotainment system, standard on Laramie Longhorn and optional on Big Horn/Lone Star, Rebel, and Laramie, adds the following features to the midlevel Uconnect 4 8.4 infotainment system: Uconnect Guardian Services powered by SiriusXM, A/M-F/M HD Radio, and a high-resolution 8.4-inch touchscreen display.

The top-of-the-line Uconnect 4C 12.0 w/ GPS Navigation infotainment system, standard on Limited and optional on all models except the base Tradesman, is the largest infotainment system available in any full-size truck and adds the following features to the premium Uconnect 4C 8.4 w/ GPS Navigation infotainment system: SiriusXM 360L Satellite Radio technology, a high-resolution, twelve-inch tablet-style glass touchscreen display, and a multi-angle camera system. The user is able to "dual-wheel" the touchscreen display, for example, they are able to view both the multi-angle camera system, as well as the Apple CarPlay or Android Auto display from their smartphone, at the same time, something that cannot be done with any of the RAM's other infotainment systems. It requires one of two premium audio system options, which are standard equipment on the trim levels this system is available with.

In addition to the four different infotainment systems available on the all-new 2019 RAM 1500 and RAM Heavy Duty (HD), there are also three different audio systems available:

 The base (six-speaker) audio system includes speakers mounted in all four doors of the truck, as well as the instrument panel. It is standard on Tradesman, Big Horn/Lone Star, and Rebel trim levels. It is not available with the Uconnect 4C 12.0 w/ GPS Navigation infotainment system.
 The "mid-level" Alpine ten-speaker premium audio system adds a 506-watt, multi-channel digital amplifier with Digital Sound Processing (DSP), an under-seat-mounted subwoofer, a center instrument panel-mounted speaker, and speakers mounted in the rear headliner of the truck. It is standard on Laramie and Laramie Longhorn trim levels and is available for the Big Horn/Lone Star and Rebel trim levels. An Alpine Electronics/Alpine emblem also appears on the center instrument panel-mounted speaker It requires either the Uconnect 4 8.4 or Uconnect 4C 8.4 w/ GPS Navigation infotainment systems.
 The top-of-the-line Harman/Kardon nineteen-speaker premium audio system is the highest-end factory audio system ever installed into a full-size truck. It includes aluminum speaker grilles that bear the Harman/Kardon emblem on the front door speaker grilles, and adds a 900-watt, multi-channel digital amplifier with Digital Sound Processing (DSP), and small speakers to the upper portion of both front doors. Standard on Limited and optional on Laramie Longhorn trim levels, it requires the Uconnect 4C 12.0 w/ GPS Navigation infotainment system. It is also only available on Crew Cab models as well.

For the 2022 model year, Ram equipped most of its trucks with an all-new U Connect 5 infotainment suite, available in five-inch (5.0"), 8.4-inch (8.4"), and twelve-inch (12.0") sizes, which came as standard equipment on most trim levels. The U Connect 5 infotainment suite, powered by Android, added a built-in virtual assistant, and wireless Apple CarPlay and Android Auto smartphone integration (in addition to their wired counterparts), as well as enhanced functionality and user customizability. Base Ram trucks will still receive the previous U Connect 3 5.0BT radio as standard equipment, though these models can also be upgraded to the 8.4-inch (8.4") U Connect 5 system.

Interior 

The center console can be configured 12 different ways. An available panoramic sunroof features  of area.

The RAM's newly redesigned interior promises increased head and leg room, and the most genuine leather trim used in any full-size truck (most manufacturers use vinyl or plastic on their full-size trucks when equipped with a leather-trimmed interior). In addition, the Limited includes additional stitched leather-trimmed dashboard surfaces and door panel trim and is the most luxurious full-size pickup interior available in its class. Like the previous-generation RAM, the all-new RAM uses genuine wood trim throughout their interiors. Available  touchscreen infotainment system is the largest touchscreen installed in a full-size truck, and the available 900-watt, nineteen-speaker Harman/Kardon premium audio system is the highest-quality factory premium audio system available on any full-size truck. A reconfigurable Thin-Film Transistor (TFT) LCD full-color instrument cluster is also available on most trim levels.

(RED) Special Edition (2022) 

For the 2022 model year, Stellantis has announced a partnership with Product Red, and each brand will release a (RED)-branded vehicle. For 2022, Ram will offer a (RED) Edition 1500, which will be based on the top-of-the-line Limited trim level and share its features. Special features on the (RED) Edition 1500 will include special exterior badging, black-finished wheels, and unique interior details. Proceeds from each (RED) Edition 1500 sold will be donated to the Product Red Foundation. In addition, Ram will release a line of special-edition (RED)-themed merchandise, which includes coolers, plaid shirts, work gloves, and T-shirts.

Production 
The Ram 1500 is built at the Sterling Heights Assembly Plant in Sterling Heights, Michigan. FCA has retooled the plant to handle the 2019 Ram 1500. Previously, the plant produced the Chrysler 200, which ended production after the 2017 model year. The Ram 1500 Classic continues to be built at both Saltillo Truck Assembly in Saltillo, Mexico and Warren Truck Assembly in Warren, Michigan. Ram Heavy-Duty (HD) models are produced at Saltillo Truck Assembly in Saltillo, Mexico.

Safety
The 2022 Ram was tested by the Insurance Institute for Highway Safety (IIHS), and the top trim of the Crew Cab version received a Top Safety Pick award:

Awards and recognition 
The 2019 Ram 1500 received multiple industry awards even before its availability to customers.

2018 

 Cars.com 2018 Detroit Auto Show's Best In Show
Autoblog Editor's #1 Pick of the 2018 Detroit Auto Show
Popular Mechanics Automotive Excellence Awards 2018
Auto 123.com's Pickup of the Year
2019 Motor Trend's Truck of the Year
Green Car Journal's 2019 Green Truck of the Year
2019 Top Pick Award by autoTRADER.ca
Best Buy designation by Le Guide de l’Auto/The Car Guide (full size pickup)
2019 Ram 1500 Rebel Pickup Truck of the Year by Four Wheeler Magazine

Wards 10 Best

 2018 Wards 10 Best Interiors
2018 Wards 10 Best User Experiences

Texas Automotive Writers Association

Off-Road Pickup Truck of Texas (Ram 1500 Rebel)
Full Size Pickup Truck of Texas
Official Truck of Texas

2019 

2019 North American Truck of the Year by NACTOY.
Best Family Car and Truck award by the Greater Atlanta Automotive Media Association.

Ram HD (2019) 
The 2019 Ram Heavy Duty was revealed at the North American International Auto Show in Detroit on January 14, 2019.

The truck is a heavy-duty (HD) version of the all-new 2019 Ram 1500.

For the 2019 model year, FCA discontinued the 6 speed G56 manual transmission in 6.7 Cummins equipped trucks. The only remaining heavy duty Ram truck with a manual transmission is the Mexican market Ram 4000 which can be optioned with a Tremec 5-speed manual mated exclusively with the 5.7L Hemi V8 engine.

References

External links

Official website

Ram Trucks
Pickup trucks